Aliaksandr Hrabovik (born 9 December 1988) is a Belarusian Greco-Roman wrestler. He won the silver medal in the men's 97 kg event at the 2019 European Games held in Minsk, Belarus.

Career 

In 2010, he competed in the men's Greco-Roman 84 kg event at the World Wrestling Championships held in Moscow, Russia where he was eliminated in his first match by Damian Janikowski of Poland.

At the European Wrestling Championships he won two medals: in 2016, he won one of the bronze medals in the men's 98 kg event and in 2017, he won the silver medal in the men's 98 kg event.

In March 2021, he competed at the European Qualification Tournament in Budapest, Hungary hoping to qualify for the 2020 Summer Olympics in Tokyo, Japan. He won his first match by walkover as his opponent, Felix Baldauf of Norway, had tested positive for COVID-19. He was then eliminated in his second match by Nikoloz Kakhelashvili of Italy. In May 2021, he also failed to qualify for the Olympics at the World Olympic Qualification Tournament held in Sofia, Bulgaria.

Achievements

References

External links 
 

Living people
1988 births
Place of birth missing (living people)
Belarusian male sport wrestlers
Wrestlers at the 2019 European Games
European Games silver medalists for Belarus
European Games medalists in wrestling
European Wrestling Championships medalists
20th-century Belarusian people
21st-century Belarusian people